Rhododendron racemosum, the racemose rhododendron, is a species of flowering plant in the heath family Ericaceae, native to forest and grassland at  in northwestern Guizhou, southwestern Sichuan, and Yunnan, China.

Description
In early spring it bears masses of pale or deep pink trumpet-shaped flowers, each with up to 10 prominent stamens.

Cultivation
In cultivation in the UK Rhododendron racemosum and the cultivar ‘Rock Rose’ have gained the Royal Horticultural Society’s Award of Garden Merit. It is hardy down to  but like most rhododendrons it requires a sheltered spot in dappled shade, and an acid soil enriched with leaf mould.

Etymology
Racemosum means "bearing inflorescences in racemes".

Gallery

References

racemosum